Régis Coulbault (born 17 August 1972) is a French retired footballer who mostly played as a defender. He notably played in Ligue 1 for S.C.Toulon before a spell in England with Southend United. He went on to play in Championnat National 2 with Hyères FC and in Non-League with F.C. Saint-Cyr. He retired in 2003 and now works as a manager at Regional' Golf.

Club career

S.C. Toulon
Coulbault is a product of the S.C.Toulon youth system. He made his first-team debut in Ligue 1 during the 1991–1992 season  before becoming a regular member of the Starting XI in 1993–1994. In the 1995–1996 season Coulbault was the starting right back on the team that reached the quarter finals of the French Cup by eliminating a Zinedine Zidane led Girondins de Bordeaux team. Coulbault was tasked with marking Zidane for large portions of the game and created the equalizing goal with a deep cross from the right to take the match to extra time where Toulon won 3–2. That same season Toulon won the Championnat National title and promotion to Ligue 2. In the final game of the season against Stade Briochin Coulbault won the game with a Golden Goal in extra time.

Southend United F.C.
After playing in several trial games in pre-season during the summer of 1997, Coulbault signed for Southend United on a one-year contract. He made his debut against Bristol City as a 56-minute substitute  and scored his first goal for the club, a 40-yard strike, three games later in a 1–1 draw with Oldham Athletic. In December he scored his third goal for the club, a "Memorable" winner in extra time against Gillingham, this was followed by more late-game heroics as he slotted home a late equalizer away to Brentford on Boxing day, securing a draw after the Shrimpers had gone down to 10 men early in the second half.

F.C. Saint-Cyr & Hyères FC
Returning to France, Coulbault signed for non-league club F.C. Saint-Cyr helping them gain promotion to Régional 1 in 1999/2000 before moving to Hyères FC in Championnat National 2 for the 2001/2002 season. He retired at the conclusion of the 2002/2003 season.

Honours 
S.C. Toulon
Championnat National - Winners: 1996

Hyères FC
Méditerranée Régional 1 - Winners: 1999

References

External links 
 Blue Anorak Profile
 

Living people
1972 births
French footballers
Association football midfielders
SC Toulon players
Southend United F.C. players
French expatriate footballers
Expatriate footballers in England
French expatriate sportspeople in England
Hyères FC players